Steven Conte is an Australian novelist who won the inaugural Prime Minister's Literary Award for Fiction in 2008 for his novel The Zookeeper's War. He was raised in the town of Guyra in New South Wales, and has subsequently lived in Sydney, Canberra, Melbourne and Warrnambool. He has worked as a bank teller, a waiter, cleaner, taxi driver, and a life model.

Bibliography

Novels
 The Zookeeper's War (2007)
 The Tolstoy Estate (2020)

Awards 
 2008 shortlisted Commonwealth Writers Prize South East Asia and South Pacific Region — Best First Book — The Zookeeper's War
 2008 winner Prime Minister's Literary Awards — Fiction — The Zookeeper's War
2021 shortlisted Walter Scott Prize — The Tolstoy Estate

References

External links
 Steven Conte personal website

Living people
21st-century Australian novelists
1966 births